Enda Caldwell is a UK and Irish radio personality and voice actor. As of 2022, he is the "drivetime host" at New York's EDM station, Pulse 87. Caldwell has also previously worked at other radio stations worldwide, including the DRM station Radio Luxembourg, Riviera Radio, Today FM and Atlantic 252.

Career
Caldwell's media career began with helping out at Atlantic 252 as an assistant to Tony West. Originally from Navan, he undertook a course in television in 1991 with Navan Community Television.

His radio career began with a Louth-based pirate radio station, Kiss FM, in Dundalk in Ireland. Caldwell later worked at Tipp FM in County Tipperary, WLR FM in Waterford, LMFM in Louth and Meath, and South East Radio in Wexford, before moving to Kiss 106 in Northern Ireland.

He was an extra (a hospital porter) in the film Angela's Ashes, which was released in 1999.

In February 2000, Caldwell was hired as the overnight presenter with the newly relaunched Atlantic 252. His work there included presenting the final live show broadcast by the station in December 2001. 

In parallel with his role at Atlantic 252, as of mid-2001, Caldwell was hosting "Planet Hits" on Today FM. Caldwell also cover-hosted several other programmes with Today FM. He also covered daytime shows at 97.4 Cool FM Northern Ireland. In September 2002, Caldwell moved to the UK to host Wyvern FM's "Home Run" for six months before returning to Ireland. He held a position with Today FM, as a Friday evening host of "Nothin' But 90s", from April 2003 to July 2005.

As of January 2004, the Sunday Business Post reported that Caldwell was working with KFM in County Kildare. From 5 April to 8 April 2004, Caldwell guest-hosted evenings at Kiss100 London as "Kieron", and in September 2004 he covered Jon Hilcock's early breakfast weekend slot on 104.9 Xfm London.

In 2006, he started working with the Luxembourg-based DRM station Radio Luxembourg.

In December 2012, Caldwell was hired by the Ohio-based internet radio station "DSN Hits". He later joined the New York dance station Pulse 87.

Caldwell also owns his own voice-over and marketing company.

References

External links
 Official website

1975 births
Living people
Irish male voice actors
People from Navan
East Coast FM presenters
Irish male radio actors
South East Radio presenters
Radio personalities from the Republic of Ireland
Irish DJs
Irish radio presenters
Electronic dance music DJs